Rudd is a surname of Norse (Danish) origin.

People with the surname
 Alyson Rudd, British journalist
 Amber Rudd, British Conservative Party MP
 Archibald Rudd, English footballer
 Beverly Rudd, British actress
 Bevil Rudd (1894–1948), South African athlete, Olympic gold medalist
 Billy Rudd (born 1941), English footballer
 Charles Rudd (1844–1916), business associate of Cecil John Rhodes
 Christopher Rudd (born 1963), English cricketer
 Christopher E. Rudd (born 1953), Canadian/British immunologist
 Daniel Rudd (1854–1933), founder of the National Black Catholic Congress
 Delaney Rudd (born 1962), American professional basketball player 1989–1993
 Dwayne Rudd (born 1976), American professional football linebacker
 Eldon Rudd (1920–2002), American politician, U.S. Representative from Arizona 1977-1987
 George Thomas Rudd (c. 1795 – 1847), English entomologist
 Hughes Rudd (1921–1992), American television journalist
 Jim Rudd (born 1943), American lobbyist and politician
 Jim Rudd (rugby league) rugby league footballer of the 1920s
 John Rudd (disambiguation), several people
 Jonathan Rudd (disambiguation), several people
 Kevin Rudd (born 1957), Australian politician, Prime Minister of Australia 2007–2010 and 2013
 Mark William Rudd (born 1947), American educator and anti-war activist
 Mike Rudd (born 1945), New Zealand musician
 Nigel Rudd (born 1946), British fellow of the Institute of Chartered Accountants
 Norman Rudd (born 1943), English Crown Court Judge (retired)
 Paul Rudd (born 1969), American film and stage actor
 Paul Rudd (DJ) (born 1979), English music producer and DJ
 Paul Ryan Rudd (1940–2010), American actor
 Phil Rudd (born 1954), drummer of the Australian band AC/DC
 Ricky Rudd (born 1956), American NASCAR driver
 Roland Rudd (born 1961), English businessman and public relations executive, brother of Amber Rudd
 Roswell Rudd (1935–2017), American jazz trombonist
 Roy H. Rudd (1906–1997), New York politician
 Steele Rudd, pseudonym of Arthur Hoey Davis (1868–1935), Australian author
 Stephen A. Rudd (1874–1936), American politician, U.S. Representative from New York 1931-1936
 Tony Rudd (1924–2017), English stockbroker and father of Amber Rudd and Roland Rudd 
 Van Thanh Rudd (born 1973), Australian artist and activist, nephew of Kevin Rudd
 Velva E. Rudd (1910–1999), American botanist
 Xavier Rudd (born 1978), Australian folk musician

See also
 Rudnitsky, shortened to Rudd, in the case of Paul Rudd

Surnames of English origin